Minnie Lou Bradley (born December 15, 1931) was inducted into the National Cowgirl Museum and Hall of Fame in 2006. Bradley is considered an innovator in the beef cattle industry.

Life
Minnie Lou Bradley was born Minnie Lou Ottinger on December 15, 1931, in Blaine County, Oklahoma. Bradley wanted a book on livestock rather than girl toys. She performed chores to pay for it. Bradley was active in the local 4-H Club, where she showed Angus cattle, sheep, and swine. She was not able to join the Future Farmers of America then as it was male-only membership. Bradley was showing animals at age 9. She received her first Angus cow at age 13. Bradley graduated from high school in Hydro, Oklahoma. She married Bill Bradley in 1955. She and Bradley raised one son and one daughter together

Career
Bradley is a rancher and a cattlewoman. She and her family own and operate the Bradley 3 Ranch in Childress County, Texas. Bradley and a handful of women were first to earn a degree in animal husbandry from Oklahoma State University (formerly Oklahoma A&M). She is the first woman to join the Intercollegiate Livestock Judging Team. She was the first woman president of the American Angus Association. She has been awarded many times by the agriculture industry in her long history for her contributions to the beef industry.

Also in 1955, the year they were married, the Bradleys bought a ranch near Childress co-owned with Billy Jack's parents. The combined property they named Bradley 3 Ranch. The two families ran it together for some time. Eventually, Minnie became the head of the ranch. Last reports showed that Billy Jack was living in Vernon, Texas, and Minnie Lou and her daughter were running Bradley 3 Ranch. Their son had died early. Bradley has been recognized for work of the Angus breed, her success in crossbreeding Angus and Hereford cattle. In 2014, her portrait was unveiled to be displayed in the Saddle and Sirloin Gallery in Lexington Kentucky.

References 

1931 births
Living people
American cattlewomen
Ranchers from Texas
People from Childress County, Texas
People from Blaine County, Oklahoma
Cowgirl Hall of Fame inductees
21st-century American women